There are at least 29 named trails in Powell County, Montana according to the U.S. Geological Survey, Board of Geographic Names.  A trail is defined as: "Route for passage from one point to another; does not include roads or highways (jeep trail, path, ski trail)."

 Blackfoot Divide Trail, el.  
 Camp Creek Pass Trail, el.  
 Catchem Creek Trail, el.  
 Center Creek Trail, el.  
 Center Ridge Trail, el.  
 Conger Creek Trail, el.  
 Conger Point Trail, el.  
 Danaher Hahn Creek Trail, el.  
 Dunham Lodgepole Trail, el.  
 Dunham Trail, el.  
 Dwight Creek Trail, el.  
 Falls Canyon Trail, el.  
 Fenn Mountain Trail, el.  
 Foolhen Creek Trail, el.  
 Foolhen Mountain Trail, el.  
 Haystack Mountain Trail, el.  
 Holland Gordon Trail, el.  
 Jumbo Lookout Trail, el.  
 Lake Otatsy Trail, el.  
 Limestone Pass Trail, el.  
 Lodgepole Trail, el.  
 McCabe Lake Creek Trail, el.  
 McDermott Trail, el.  
 Meadow Creek Trail, el.  
 Mineral Creek Trail, el.  
 Monture Haun Trail, el.  
 Monture Trail, el.  
 Morrell Falls National Recreation Trail, el.  
 Pyramid Pass Trail, el.

Further reading

See also
 List of trails of Montana
 Trails of Yellowstone National Park

Notes

Geography of Powell County, Montana
 Powell County
Transportation in Powell County, Montana